Ats Purje (born 3 August 1985) is an Estonian professional footballer who plays as a forward for Tallinna Kalev.

Club career

Early career
Purje began playing football at Tallinna Jalgpallikool, where he was coached by Aivar Tiidus. He made his senior league debut in the IV liiga with SC Real in 2001.

Levadia
In 2003, Purje joined Meistriliiga club Levadia. He made his debut in the Meistriliiga on 15 March 2003, playing for Levadia's Tallinn-based team against the Maardu-based Levadia team in a 0–1 away loss. Purje scored his first Meistriliiga goal on 13 May 2003, in a 9–3 away win over Kuressaare. In July 2003, Purje was moved to the Maardu team. His first trophy with Levadia came in the 2003–04 Estonian Cup. Purje won his first Meistriliiga title in the 2004 season. He won two more Meistriliiga titles in 2006 and 2007, and two more Estonian Cups in 2005 and 2007.

FC Inter
In December 2007, Purje signed a two-year contract with Veikkausliiga club FC Inter. On 12 April 2008, he won his first trophy with FC Inter in the 2008 Finnish League Cup. Purje made his debut in the Veikkausliiga on 27 April 2008, and scored his side's first goal in a 3–1 home victory over RoPS. He won the Veikkausliiga in the 2008 season. On 31 October 2009, Purje came on as a 79th-minute substitute in FC Inter's 2–1 victory over Tampere United in the Finnish Cup final, winning his third trophy with the club.

AEP
In June 2010, Purje signed a one-year contract with Cypriot First Division club AEP, with an option to extend it for another year. He made his debut in the Cypriot First Division on 29 August 2010, and scored his side's only goal in a 1–2 loss to Ethnikos Achna.

Ethnikos Achna
In May 2011, Purje signed for Ethnikos Achna. He made his debut for the club on 27 August 2011, in a 0–1 loss to Anorthosis.

KuPS
On 3 April 2012, Purje signed a one-year contract with Veikkausliiga club KuPS. In September, he signed a two-year contract extension that would keep him with the club until 2014. Purje was his side's top scorer in the 2012 season with six goals and was named the club's Player of the Year. He was once again his club's top scorer in the 2014 season, with nine goals.

Nõmme Kalju
On 9 February 2015, Purje signed a three-year contract with Meistriliiga club Nõmme Kalju. On 30 May 2015, he won his fourth Estonian Cup. Purje was Nõmme Kalju's top scorer in the Meistriliiga for two consecutive seasons, in 2015 and 2016.

Return to KuPS
On 27 December 2016, Purje returned to KuPS for an undisclosed fee, on a one-year deal with an option to extend the contract for another year.

Tallinna Kalev
For the 2021 Season Purje returned to Estonia signing for the Esiliiga club Tallinna Kalev while also managing their under-21 team in the Esiliiga B.

International career
Purje began his youth career in 2002 with the Estonia under-19 team. He also represented the under-20 and under-21 national sides, amassing 18 youth appearances and scoring 3 goals overall.

Purje made his senior international debut for Estonia on 11 October 2006, replacing Teet Allas in the 81st minute of a 0–2 away loss to Russia in a UEFA Euro 2008 qualifying match. He scored his first international goal on 20 August 2008, in a 2–1 home win over Malta in a friendly. Purje came on as a second-half substitute in both matches against the Republic of Ireland in the UEFA Euro 2012 qualifying play-offs as Estonia lost 1–5 on aggregate.

Career statistics

Club

International

International goals
As of 9 June 2018. Estonia score listed first, score column indicates score after each Purje goal.

Honours

Club
Levadia
Meistriliiga: 2004, 2006, 2007
Estonian Cup: 2003–04, 2004–05, 2006–07

FC Inter
Veikkausliiga: 2008
Finnish Cup: 2009
Finnish League Cup: 2008

Nõmme Kalju
Estonian Cup: 2014–15

Kuopion Palloseura
Veikkausliiga: 2019

Individual
Veikkausliiga Player of the Month: May 2008
KuPS Player of the Year: 2012

References

External links

1985 births
Living people
Footballers from Tallinn
Estonian footballers
Association football forwards
Association football wingers
Esiliiga players
Meistriliiga players
FCI Levadia Tallinn players
Nõmme Kalju FC players
Veikkausliiga players
Kakkonen players
FC Inter Turku players
Kuopion Palloseura players
Cypriot First Division players
AEP Paphos FC players
Ethnikos Achna FC players
Estonia youth international footballers
Estonia under-21 international footballers
Estonia international footballers
Estonian expatriate footballers
Estonian expatriate sportspeople in Finland
Expatriate footballers in Finland
Estonian expatriate sportspeople in Cyprus
Expatriate footballers in Cyprus